The 2020 Boston College Eagles football team represented Boston College during the 2020 NCAA Division I FBS football season. The Eagles played their home games at Alumni Stadium in Chestnut Hill, Massachusetts, and competed in the Atlantic Coast Conference (ACC). Led by first-year head coach Jeff Hafley, the team compiled an overall record of 6–5, and a 5–5 record in ACC games.

After the regular season concluded, the Eagles opted out from playing in a bowl game. Boston College was the first team to opt out of bowl season due to concerns over COVID-19.

Schedule
Boston College had games scheduled against Holy Cross, Kansas, Ohio and Purdue, which were all canceled due to the COVID-19 pandemic.

The ACC released their schedule on July 29, 2020, with specific dates selected at a later date.

Players drafted into the NFL

References

Further reading
 

Boston College
Boston College Eagles football seasons
Boston College Eagles football
Boston College Eagles football